Eoophyla piscatorum is a moth in the family Crambidae. It was described by David John Lawrence Agassiz in 2012. It is found in Kenya.

The wingspan is 18–22 mm. The forewings are whitish and the base of the costa is fuscous. There is a fuscous subbasal fascia and a dull yellow antemedian fascia mixed with fuscous. The hindwings are white with a yellowish discal spot, ringed with fuscous.

Etymology
The species name is derived from the Latin word for of the fishermen and refers to the type locality which is a fishing camp run by the Kenya Fly Fishers Club.

References

External links
Kenya Fly Fishers Club

Eoophyla
Moths described in 2012